The 2010–11 CONCACAF Champions League preliminary round was played from July to August 2010. The first legs were played July 27–29, 2010, and the second legs were played August 3–5, 2010.

The draw for the preliminary round and the Group Stage was held on May 19, 2010, at the CONCACAF headquarters in New York City. Teams from the same association (excluding "wildcard" teams which replace a team from another association) may not be drawn with each other.

A total of 16 teams competed, divided into eight ties. Each tie was played over two legs, and the away goals rule would be used, but not after a tie enters extra time, and so a tie would be decided by penalty shootout if the aggregate score is level after extra time.

The winners of each tie advanced to the group stage to join the eight automatic qualifiers.

Matches

|}

All Times U.S. Eastern (UTC-4)

First leg

Second leg

Cruz Azul won 9–2 on aggregate.

Toronto FC won 3–2 on aggregate.

Seattle Sounders FC won 2–1 on aggregate.

Puerto Rico Islanders won 5–3 on aggregate.

Santos Laguna won 6–0 on aggregate.

Marathón won 4–2 on aggregate.

Joe Public won 6-4 on aggregate.

FAS won 3-1 on aggregate.

References

External links
 CONCACAF Champions League official website

Preliminary Round